The 2016–17 Tunisian Ligue Professionnelle 3 (Tunisian Professional League) was competed by 48 teams divided in 4 groups of 12 teams each. The winner of each group is promoted to Tunisian Ligue Professionnelle 2.

Teams

Group 1
 Ahly Mateur
 AS Metline
 Association Mégrine Sport
 AS Mhamdia
 AS Oued Ellil
 AS Soukra
 CO Transports
 ES Radès
 JS El Omrane
 Mouldia Manouba
 Stir Sportive Zarzouna 
 VS Menzel Abderrahmane

Group 2
 AS Jelma
 AS Barnoussa
 AS Soliman
 CS Makthar
 Dahmani AC
 ES Haffouz
 ES Beni-Khalled
 ES Fahs
 ES Oueslatia
 RS Sbiba
 US Bousalem
 US Sbeitla

Group 3
 Ahly Bouhjar
 AS Rejiche
 CS Bembla
 CS Hergla
 CS Hilalien
 CS Chebba
 El Makarem de Mahdia
 HS Kalâa Kebira
 Kalâa Sport
 Sporting Club Moknine
 Stade Soussien
 US Ksour Essef

Group 4
 CS Jbeniana
 CS Redeyef
 Espoir Sportif de Jerba Midoun
 ES El Jem
 ES Feriana
 FS Ksar Gafsa
 LPS Tozeur
 Océano Club de Kerkennah
 PS Sakiet Daier
 US Métouia
 Wydad El Hamma
 ZS Chammakh

Standings

Group 1 table

Group 2 table

Group 3 table

Group 4 table

See also
2016–17 Tunisian Ligue Professionnelle 1
2016–17 Tunisian Ligue Professionnelle 2
2016–17 Tunisian Cup

External links
 2015–16 Ligue 3 on RSSSF.com
 Fédération Tunisienne de Football website
 Ligue 3

Tunisian Ligue Professionnelle 3